Daniela Löwenberg (born 11 January 1988) is a German football midfielder, who plays for BV Cloppenburg.

Club career

Club statistics

International career
Löwenberg was a member of the German U-19 national team that won the 2006 and 2007 Under-19 European Championships.

References

External links
 

1988 births
Living people
Footballers from Dortmund
German women's footballers
SG Wattenscheid 09 (women) players
SGS Essen players
1. FFC Turbine Potsdam players
Frauen-Bundesliga players
2. Frauen-Bundesliga players
Women's association football midfielders
BV Cloppenburg (women) players